Gail Hershatter is an American historian  of Modern China who holds the Distinguished Professor of History chair at the University of California, Santa Cruz. She previously taught in the history department at Williams College.

She graduated from Hampshire College with a B.A., from Stanford University with a M.A., and from Stanford University with a Ph.D. 
She was elected vice-president of the Association for Asian Studies in 2010 and subsequently elected president the following year.
She was an assistant director for the documentary The Gate of Heavenly Peace.

Her research interests include modern Chinese women's history and labor studies. Her 2011 monograph, The Gender of Memory, uses the lens of rural women in Shaanxi Province, China, to examine revolutionary China in the 1950s and 1960s.

Awards
 1997 Joan Kelly Memorial Prize in Women's History, American Historical Association
 2007 Guggenheim Fellow
 2015 American Academy of Arts and Sciences

Works
Women and China's Revolutions, Rowman & Littlefield, 2019, 
The Gender of Memory: Rural Women and China's Collective Past, University of California Press, 2011, 
 The Workers of Tianjin, 1900–1949, Stanford University Press, 1986, 
 Dangerous Pleasures: Prostitution and Modernity in Twentieth-Century Shanghai, University of California Press, 1997, 
Women in China's long twentieth century, University of California Press, 2007, 
Personal voices: Chinese women in the 1980's, Authors Emily Honig, Gail Hershatter, Stanford University Press, 1988, 
Remapping China: fissures in historical terrain, Editor Gail Hershatter, Stanford University Press, 1996, 
 Guide to Women's Studies in China, editor Gail Hershatter, Institute of East Asian Studies, University of California, Berkeley, Center for Chinese Studies, 1998, 
 Engendering China: Women, Culture, and the State, Editor Christina K. Gilmartin, Harvard University Press, 1994, .

References

American sinologists
Hampshire College alumni
Stanford University alumni
University of California, Santa Cruz faculty
Living people
21st-century American historians
American women historians
Presidents of the Association for Asian Studies
Historians of China
Women's historians
Year of birth missing (living people)
Women orientalists
21st-century American women